NGC 3307 is a lenticular galaxy located about 185 million light-years away in the constellation Hydra. The galaxy was discovered by astronomer John Herschel on March 22, 1836 and is a member of the Hydra Cluster.

See also 
 List of NGC objects (3001–4000)

References

External links

Hydra Cluster
Hydra (constellation)
Barred spiral galaxies
3307 
31430 
Astronomical objects discovered in 1836
Discoveries by John Herschel